Gaudenzio Botti  (1698 – 6 March 1775) was an Italian painter of the Baroque period, mainly active in his native Brescia.

He trained initially in Brescia with Faustino Raineri, a local landscape painter. Botti said he painted in the style of the Dutch landscape painter Berghem. He painted both interior and exterior scenes; the interior scenes were often candle-lit.

References

1698 births
1775 deaths
18th-century Italian painters
Italian male painters
Painters from Brescia
Italian Baroque painters
18th-century Italian male artists